Het Meisje met de Blauwe Hoed is a 1934 Dutch comedy film directed by Rudolf Meinert.

Cast
Truus Van Aalten as Betsy
Lou Bandy as Toontje
Roland Varno as Daantje
Adrienne Solser as Juffrouw Pieters (as Adriënne Solser)
Hein Harms as Pieters
Willem van der Veer as Kapitein
Willy Haak as Zijn vrouw
Matthieu van Eysden as De Fourier
Dries Krijn as De Schrijver
Johnny Roeg as De Sergeant
Gusta Chrispijn-Mulder as Juffrouw Jansma
Tony van den Berg as Truus (as Toni van den Berg)
M. Braakensiek as Betsie's moeder

External links

Het meisje met de blauwe hoed, Eye Filmmuseum (Video)
 Het meisje met de blauwe hoed, filmdatabase.eyefilm.nl

1934 comedy films
Dutch black-and-white films
Films directed by Rudolf Meinert
Dutch comedy-drama films
Dutch musical comedy films